Nishikanta Chattopadhyay was a Bengali scholar and the first Bengali to earn a PhD from a European University.

Early life
Chattopadhyay was born in July 1852 in Pashchimpara in Bikrampur, Dhaka, Bengal Presidency, British India. He graduated from Progress School in 1868 and then from Presidency University. In 1898, he moved to London, Great Britain. He joined Leipzig University where he history, linguistics, and philosophy. He was expelled from Leipzig University from being an atheist. He completed his PhD from the University of Zurich in Switzerland. His thesis was titled The Yatras, Or The Popular Dramas of Bengal.

Career
After completing his PhD, Chattopadhyay taught linguistics at Saint Petersburg State University for two years. He taught in different universities after returning to India. He created the Dhaka-based Balya Bibaha Nibarani Sabha' ( translation: Association for the Prevention of Child Marriage). He wrote in the Abala Bandhab against child marriages and for women's rights. He wrote a number of books in English and German.

Bibliography
Popular Dramas of Bengal (1882) 
Some Reminiscences of Old England (1902) 
The Study of History (1902) 
Lecture in Zoroastrianism (1894) 
Reminisces of Justice Ranade (1901)

Death
He died on 25 February 1910.

References

1852 births
1910 deaths
Bengali writers
People from Munshiganj District